Seif Shenawy (born 9 September 2001 in Cairo) is an Egyptian professional squash player. As of October 2022, he was ranked number 89 in the world. He won the 2022 Burnt Open.

References

2001 births
Living people
Egyptian male squash players
21st-century Egyptian people